Adolf Franklin Rebner (also Adolph Rebner) (21 November 1876 in Vienna – 19 June 1967 in Baden-Baden) was an Austrian violinist and violist.

Rebner was a student of Jakob Grün at the Vienna Conservatory, graduating there with first prize in 1891. Having continued his studies in Paris with Martin Pierre Marsick he settled in Frankfurt in 1896 where he was concertmaster at the Frankfurt Opera. He succeeded Hugo Heermann as professor of violin at the Hoch Conservatory and became famous as leader of his string quartet, which toured Germany, France, Spain and England. In 1934 he was forced to leave Germany (he was released from the Hoch Conservatory in 1933 because he was Jewish) and moved to Vienna. His son Edward Wolfgang Rebner (born 1910 in Frankfurt, died 1993, Munich) was an accomplished pianist and accompanist, who settled in the US in 1939.

Ensembles 
 Museums-Quartett (also known as Heermann Quartett and Frankfurter Quartett): Hugo Heermann, Hugo Becker, Fritz Bassermann and Adolf Rebner.
 Rebner-Quartett: Adolf Rebner, Johannes Hegar, Walther Davisson and Ludwig Natterer (from 1916 with Paul Hindemith as second violinist, later violist).

References 
 Peter Cahn, Das Hoch'sche Konservatorium in Frankfurt am Main (1878-1978), Frankfurt am Main: Kramer, 1979.
 Hindemith, Paul. Selected Letters of Paul Hindemith. Yale University Press, 1995. 
 Baker's Biographical Dictionary of Musicians, (Nicolas Slonimsky, Ed.) New York: G. Schirmer, 1958

1876 births
1967 deaths
Austrian classical violinists
Male classical violinists
Austrian classical violists